The Imperial Order of Saint Anastasia the Holy Great Martyr 'Alleviatrix of Captives' is a dynastic order of the former Russian Imperial House for women. It was established and its statutes approved on August 20, 2010 by Grand Duchess Maria Vladimirovna. 

The order is composed of only one class.

Creation
The order was established in honor of St. Anastasia, the patron saint of the first Tsaritsa consort of the Romanov dynasty, Anastasia Romanovna (1530-1560). The creation of the order marked the 450th anniversary of the repose of Anastasia Romanovna, and was in anticipation of the 400th anniversary of the end of the time of troubles and the establishment of the House of Romanov in 2013. 
 
The order is awarded by the head of the house  exclusively to Russian women who have been distinguished by their acts in the fields of charity, culture, education, science, medicine, and other activities to benefit the Russian state or the Imperial House.

Award Classes of the Order 
The Order of St. Anastasia has only one class, Dames.

The Insignia of the Order 

The insignia of the Order consists of a white enamel cross with indented ends, edged in blue and gold with heraldically right-facing Romanov griffins in the axillae, on a white ribbon edged with blue and gold. The medallion of the device depicts in enamel the icon of the Holy Great Martyr Anastasia.  The Cross is surmounted by an Imperial crown. 

Dames of the Order of St. Anastasia the Holy Great Martyr wear the Device of the Order on the left side of the breast suspended from a ribbon, tied into a bow, 45 mm. in width.

Recipients 
 Grand Duchess Maria Vladimirovna, The Grand Duchess of Russia, founder, sovereign and Grand Mistress of the order.
 Natalia Poklonskaya, prosecutor of the Republic of Crimea. (2014).
 Marie-Louise Coleiro Preca, 9th President of Malta (2017).
 Princess Victoria Romanovna (née Rebecca Virginia Bettarini) (2021).
 Carla Virginia Cacciatore (mother of Princess Victoria Romanovna) (2021).

References

2010 establishments in Russia
Orders of chivalry of Russia